The black sawtoothed eel (Serrivomer brevidentatus) is an eel in the family Nemichthyidae (snipe eels). It was described by Louis Roule and Léon Bertin in 1929, originally as a subspecies of Serrivomer sector. It is a marine, deep water-dwelling eel which is known from the eastern and western Atlantic Ocean, including the Strait of Gibraltar, Cape Verde, and the United States. It dwells at a depth range of 150–6000 metres. Males can reach a maximum total length of 60 centimetres.

References

Nemichthyidae
Taxa named by Louis Roule
Taxa named by Léon Bertin
Fish described in 1929